Events from the year 1637 in Denmark.

Incumbents 
 Monarch – Christian IV

Events
 February  A contract was signed with a Henrik van Dingklage in Emden for the supply of bricks for the construction of Rundetårn in Copenhagen. The first three shiploads are to be delivered in May, the next three loads the following month and the remainder on demand.

Undated
 Corfitz Ulfeldt is appointed as Governor of Copenhagen.

Births

Full date missing
 Dieterich Buxtehude, composer (died 1707)
 Ove Ramel, landowner (died 1685)

Deaths 
 18 March  Dorothea Elisabeth Christiansdatter, daughter of Christian IV (born 1629)
 9 October  Anna Svane, merchant (born c. 1573)

Publications
 Christen Sørensen Longomontanus: Coronis Problematica ex Mysteriis trium Numerorum

References 

 
Denmark
Years of the 17th century in Denmark